"Shine" is the first single from the album Make Some Noise by Krystal Meyers. It was released in the United States and Japan in 2008.

Background
"Shine" was composed by Krystal Meyers, Josiah "Chuks" Bell, Robert "Aurel M" Marvin, and Aaron Rice. It was uploaded onto iTunes as a Digital Single and peaked at No. 12 on the R&R Christian CHR chart. The song charted on the CHR Recurrents chart at No. 9.

"Shine" is about God shining through you and not letting anyone get in the way of that shine. From Krystal Meyers Song by Song, Krystal writes, "Recently I've learned that I need to strive to put my best effort into every opportunity God has given me. I need to use the talents and opportunities that God has given me, to the fullest extent possible. The line from the song that says, 'nobody's gonna to get in the way of my shine,' definitely sums up what this song is about. I'm blessed to be on this exciting journey, and I'm not going to let anything get in the way of my shine."

References

2008 singles
Krystal Meyers songs
Songs written by Krystal Meyers
2008 songs
Essential Records (Christian) singles
Song recordings produced by Ian Eskelin